

Cuerda seca (Spanish for "dry cord") is a technique used when applying coloured glazes to ceramic surfaces.

Description 
When different coloured glazes are applied to a ceramic surface, the glazes have a tendency to run together during the firing process. In the cuerda seca technique, the water-soluble glazes are separated on the surface by thin lines of a greasy substance to prevent them running out of their delineated areas. A dark pigment such as manganese carbonate is usually mixed with the grease to produce a dark line around each coloured area.

History 
Although some scholars have postulated an Iranian origin (citing Ummayyad-era examples from Suza), many scholars believe that the cuerda seca technique originated primarily in al-Andalus (Islamic Spain and Portugal) in the second half of the 10th century, during the Umayyad period. The technique was further advanced during the Taifas period in the 11th century. Preserved fragments of tiles from the late 12th-century minaret of the Kasbah Mosque in Marrakesh, Morocco, have been cited as the earliest surviving example of cuerda seca tilework being used for architectural decoration.

In central Asia tiles were manufactured using the cuerda seca technique from the second half of the 14th century. The introduction of different coloured glazes is recorded in the mausoleums of the Shah-i-Zinda necropolis in Samarkand. In the 1360s the colours were restricted to white, turquoise and cobalt blue but by 1386 the palette had been expanded to include yellow, light-green and unglazed red. Large quantities of cuerda seca tiles were produced during the Timurid (1370–1507) and Safavid (1501–1736) periods.

In the 15th century Persian potters from Tabriz introduced the technique into Turkey and were responsible for decorating the Yeşil Mosque  in Bursa (1419-1424). Within the Ottoman Empire cuerda seca tilework fell out of fashion in the 1550s and new imperial buildings were decorated with underglaze-painted tiles from İznik. The last building in Istanbul to include cuerda seca tilework was the Kara Ahmed Pasha Mosque which was designed in 1555 but only completed in 1572.

Gallery

Notes

Sources

Further reading

External links

The cuerda seca method, Qantara project.

Types of pottery decoration
Ceramic glazes
Tiling